Nucleosome assembly protein 1-like 4 is a protein that in humans is encoded by the NAP1L4 gene.

This gene encodes a member of the nucleosome assembly protein (NAP) family which can interact with both core and linker histones. It can shuttle between the cytoplasm and nucleus, suggesting a role as a histone chaperone. This gene is one of several located near the imprinted gene domain of 11p15.5, an important tumor-suppressor gene region. Alterations in this region have been associated with the Beckwith-Wiedemann syndrome, Wilms tumor, rhabdomyosarcoma, adrenocortical carcinoma, and lung, ovarian, and breast cancer.

References

Further reading

Human proteins